The VII Memorial of Hubert Jerzy Wagner was held in Poland from 20 to 23 August 2009. 6 teams participated in the tournament.

Qualification
All teams except the host must receive an invitation from the organizers.

Squads

Venue

Results
All times are Central European Summer Time (UTC+02:00).

Pool A

Pool B

5th place

3rd place

Finale

Final standing

Awards
MVP:  Bartosz Kurek
Best Spiker:  Cristian Savani
Best Blocker:  Daniel Pliński
Best Server:  Saša Starović
Best Setter:  Paweł Zagumny
Best Receiver  Matej Černič
Best Libero:  Qi Ren

References

External links
 Official website

Memorial of Hubert Jerzy Wagner
Memorial of Hubert Jerzy Wagner
Memorial of Hubert Jerzy Wagner